The Érd minaret (Hungarian: Érdi minaret) is an Ottoman era minaret tower situated in Érd near capital Budapest in Hungary. It is one of only three Ottoman era minarets still surviving in Hungary. The other two are the Eger minaret and the minaret of Yakovalı Hasan Paşa Mosque in Pécs. 

The minaret is 23 metres (75 feet) tall and constructed with limestone. It was built in the 17th century as part of a mosque by Ottoman Muslims and use for the Muslim call to prayer (Adhan). The minaret is a registered monument of Hungary with identification 7014 and reference number 7012.

The minaret stands alone in Érd-Ófalu, near the dam of the Danube, next to a trace of an ancient Roman military road (Mecset Street).

History
The minaret in Érd was built in 17th century as part of a Turkish mosque in Érd. The mosque no longer exists but descriptions survive. The historian József Molnár gives features of the mosque as a rectangular ornate building with colorful windows, carpets and a Mihrab (prayer niche) opposite the entrance of a stone-framed door. There was a balcony protected by wooden bars, where the muezzin (crier who makes the Islamic call to prayer) made his way to the minaret.

A copy of the mosque Mihrab (prayer niche) made with iron reinforced concrete has been re-erected near the minaret.

Architecture
The structure of the minaret tower consists of a free standing cylindrical base, conical transition and a polygonal upper part. The middle and top closures are restorations and reconstructions. Entrance opening is segmented and is located higher off the ground.

Gallery

See also
 Eger
 Minaret
 Ottoman Hungary
 List of oldest minarets

References

Ottoman architecture in Hungary
Minarets in Hungary
Towers in Hungary